Kieran Allen (born November 21, 1975) is a former professional rugby league footballer who played in the 1990s and 2000s. He also represented England School boys as captain, then Great Britain rugby league.

External links
Statistics at rugbyleagueproject.org
Huddersfield extend NFP lead
Britain show off strength in depth
"Kieran Allen" AND "Rugby League" at BBC → Sport

Hunslet R.L.F.C. players
Living people
1975 births
English rugby league players
Rugby league five-eighths
Rugby league fullbacks
Wakefield Trinity players